Barbara D'Urso (born Maria Carmela D'Urso; 7 May 1957) is an Italian television personality, television host, actress and writer.

Career 
D'Urso was born in Naples, Campania. Her father was from Laurenzana (died in 1996), and her mother, who died when Barbara was 11, was born in Sant'Eufemia d'Aspromonte. She made her debut in 1977 in the programme Goal, alongside Diego Abatantuono, Teo Teocoli and Massimo Boldi. The following year she took part in the variety show Stryx.  In 1979 she presented the programme Che combinazione broadcast on Raidue, and the year afterward, together with Pippo Baudo, she appeared in Domenica In on Raiuno.
That same year, 1980, she also made her debut as a singer, with the single Dolceamaro, which was not very successful.

In 1984 she appeared naked on the front cover of Playboy and Playmen magazines. After that, she started working for the television network of Silvio Berlusconi: she participated in a television fiction, and in 1995 she also presented Agenzia matrimoniale, but she returned to the RAI with In famiglia together with Le ragazze di piazza di Spagna, Donne di mafia and Una donna scomoda.

She received moderate notability as a result of her performance in La dottoressa Giò (1997).

Since then she has taken part in many reality shows. For three years d'Urso presented three editions of Grande Fratello, the Italian version of the Big Brother (one in 2003 and two editions in 2004). In 2005 she was the host of the Italian version of The Farm. D'Urso maintained this role for two years.
In June 2005 she had a role in the TV series Ricomincio da me.

In 2006 she took part in "Reality Circus", which was unsuccessful, and in 2007 with Uno due tre stalla.

In January 2008 she presented Mattino Cinque, with Claudio Brachino; this was followed in the spring of 2008 with Lo show dei record, dedicated to the Guinness World Records.
In autumn 2008, she presented the prime time show Fantasia, while in the season of 2008/2009 she hosted Pomeriggio Cinque and Mattino Cinque.

In the 2009/2010 season, she left Mattino cinque and became the presenter of Domenica Cinque, a Sunday afternoon programme, and as of 2011, she presents Pomeriggio 5.
In the 2011 season she was replaced by Federica Panicucci.

In December 2010 she hosted the New Year Canale 5's show Capodanno cinque and, in January 2011, left Domenica Cinque to host the primetime show Stasera che sera!, which aired for only two episodes and was suspended because of extremely low ratings.
In September 2011 she hosted the program Baila! which was also cancelled after 4 episodes due to a court sentence for plagiarism of the program Dancing with the Stars.

Discography
Dolceamaro (1980)
Più forti di prima (2015)
 Dolceamaro with Cristiano Malgioglio

Singles
"Dolceamaro/Se mi guardi così" (1980)

Music videos
2019 - Dolceamaro with Cristiano Malgioglio

Music videos by other artists with Barbara D'Urso
 2020 - Come Adamo ed Eva: Live Milano - The Club/Fidelio Éva Henger with Sciarra

Filmography

Films

Television

Documentary
 Il Ribelle – Giacomo Franciosa – (2010)

Theatre
 Appuntamento d'amore –  P. Passalacqua (1993)
 E meno male che c'è Maria –  P. Garinei (1999)
 Lisistrata – Walter Manfrè (2002)
 La vedova scaltra –  W. Manfrè (2007)
 Il letto ovale –  G. Landi (2007–2008)

Books
 Più forti di prima, (Arnoldo Mondadori Editore, 2010)
 Tanto poi esce il sole, (Arnoldo Mondadori Editore, 2011)
 Ma credo ancora nell'amore – Sopravvivere alle ferite del cuore, (Arnoldo Mondadori Editore, 2012)
 Ecco come faccio, (Arnoldo Mondadori Editore, 2013)
 La mia Contursi (Arnoldo Mondadori Editore, 2014)

References

External links 
 Barbara D'Urso – Sito ufficiale

Living people
1957 births
Italian television presenters
Italian women television presenters
People from Torre del Greco
People of Lucanian descent
People of Calabrian descent
People named in the Panama Papers